Julien Edwards (born July 30, 1988) is a former footballer. Born in Canada, he represented the Guyana national team.

Playing career 
Edwards began playing at the college level with Drake Bulldogs in 2006, where he appeared in a total of 50 matches, and earned All-Missouri Valley Conference first team and was selected for the NSCAA All-Region team in 2009. During the college off season he played in the USL Premier Development League originally with  Ottawa Fury, and later with Des Moines Menace.

In 2011, he signed his first professional contract with expansion franchise Capital City F.C. in the Canadian Soccer League. During his tenure with Ottawa he reached the CSL Championship against Toronto Croatia, where the match concluded in a 1-0 victory for Croatia. He later played in the GFF Elite League with Alpha United FC. Throughout his tenure with Alpha he featured in the 2011 CFU Club Championship. In 2012, he returned to the Canadian Soccer League to play with Kingston FC.

In 2013, he played in the Première Ligue de soccer du Québec with FC Gatineau. In 2017, he played in League1 Ontario with Toronto Skillz FC.

International career 
In 2010, he was called to a Canada men's national under-23 soccer team camp organized by head coach Tony Fonseca. Edwards instead made his debut for the Guyana national football team on March 31, 2012 in a friendly match against French Guiana. He featured in the 2012 Caribbean Cup qualification match against Saint Vincent and the Grenadines. In total he has earned six caps for Guyana.

Honors 
Alpha United FC

 GFF National Super League: 2012

References 

Living people
1988 births
Association football defenders
Soccer players from Toronto
Guyanese footballers
Guyana international footballers
Canadian soccer players
Canadian people of Guyanese descent
Ottawa Fury (2005–2013) players
Des Moines Menace players
Alpha United FC players
Kingston FC players
USL League Two players
Canadian Soccer League (1998–present) players
Première ligue de soccer du Québec players
League1 Ontario players
Toronto Skillz FC players
FC Gatineau players